The 96th Pennsylvania House of Representatives District is located in South Central Pennsylvania and has been represented by Mike Sturla since  1991.

District profile
The 96th District is located in Lancaster County and includes the following areas:

East Petersburg, Pennsylvania
 Lancaster (part)
Ward 01 
Ward 02 (part)
Division 01 
Ward 05, 
Ward 06 (part)
Division 01 
Division 02 
Division 03 
Division 04 
Division 05 
Division 06 
Division 07 
Ward 09
 Manheim Township (part)

District 01 
District 03 
District 04 
District 05 
District 07 A 
District 07 B 
District 08 
District 09 
District 10 
District 11 
District 14 
District 15 
District 16 
District 17 
District 18 
District 19 
District 20 
District 21 
District 22 
District 23

Representatives

References

 

Government of Lancaster County, Pennsylvania
96